Travis Shawn Moen (born April 6, 1982) is a Canadian former professional ice hockey player who most recently played under contract for the Dallas Stars of the National Hockey League (NHL). Although he was born in Swift Current, Saskatchewan, he grew up in Stewart Valley, Saskatchewan. He was originally drafted in the fifth round of the 2000 NHL Entry Draft by the Calgary Flames; however, he never played for the club.

Playing career

Junior
Travis Moen played for the Kelowna Rockets in the Western Hockey League (WHL) for five years, from 1998 to 2003. Moen played in 181 games for the Rockets, scoring a total of 27 goals, 31 assists and 58 points with 399 penalty minutes.

Professional

Moen was drafted in the fifth round, 155th overall in the 2000 NHL Entry Draft by the Calgary Flames, but was never signed to a contract by the Flames and remained in the WHL. As a free agent, Moen was signed by the Chicago Blackhawks on October 21, 2002. The Blackhawks assigned him to play for their then-American Hockey League (AHL) affiliate, the Norfolk Admirals, for the 2002–03 season.

Moen managed to make the Blackhawks in 2003–04 and played all 82 games that season. The year after, he played for the Admirals due to the 2004–05 NHL lockout.

Before the 2005–06 season, Moen was traded to the Mighty Ducks of Anaheim in exchange for Mikael Holmqvist on July 30, 2005. Moen played 39 games for the Mighty Ducks that season, and appeared in his first Stanley Cup playoff game, also scoring his first playoff goal in a game against the Colorado Avalanche on May 5, 2006. Moen was a healthy scratch on and off during the playoffs until the Mighty Ducks were eliminated by the Edmonton Oilers.

In the 2006–07 season, Moen played on the Ducks' third line with Frank J. Selke Trophy candidate Samuel Påhlsson and Rob Niedermayer, the only line that Head Coach Randy Carlyle did not change throughout the course of the season. Moen also scored his first multigoal game of his career in a game against the Oilers, where he scored two goals.

The Ducks qualified for the 2007 playoffs, and in the Western Conference Semi-finals, Moen scored the game-winning goal in overtime in Game 4 against the Vancouver Canucks to give Anaheim a 3–1 series lead. Moen then scored another game-winning goal in Game 1 of the 2007 Stanley Cup Final against the Ottawa Senators. He was also credited with the Cup-winning goal in Game 5 to win his first Stanley Cup. The goal was actually an own goal by the Senators' Chris Phillips. However, since Moen was the last Duck to touch the puck, he was credited with the goal.

Moen was traded to the San Jose Sharks on March 4, 2009, along with Kent Huskins in exchange for Nick Bonino, Timo Pielmeier and a fourth-round draft pick in 2011.

On July 10, 2009, Moen signed a three-year contract worth $1.5 million per season as a free agent with the Montreal Canadiens. He scored his first goal in the first game of the season with the Canadiens in his debut against the Toronto Maple Leafs in a 4–3 win. He later scored his second goal in the second game against the Buffalo Sabres.

On June 29, 2012, Moen signed a four-year, $7.2 million contract extension with the Canadiens, averaging $1.8 million a year.

On November 11, 2014, Moen was traded to the Dallas Stars in exchange for defenceman Sergei Gonchar. On April 3, 2015, Moen was awarded his first career penalty shot and scored, beating St. Louis Blues goaltender Brian Elliott . On November 29, 2016 Moen announced his retirement.

Personal life
During the off-season whilst with the Anaheim Ducks, Moen worked on his family's  farm in his hometown of Stewart Valley, Saskatchewan.

Moen made an appearance as himself, along with the Stanley Cup, in the episode "Bed and Brake Fast" of the Canadian TV show Corner Gas.

Career statistics

Awards and honours

Transactions
 June 24, 2000 — Drafted by the Calgary Flames in the fifth round, 155th overall;
 October 21, 2002 — Signed as a free agent by the Chicago Blackhawks;
 March 8, 2004 — Waived by the Chicago Blackhawks;
 July 30, 2005 — Traded to the Mighty Ducks of Anaheim for Mikael Holmqvist;
 March 4, 2009 — Traded to the San Jose Sharks along with Kent Huskins for Nick Bonino, Timo Pielmeier and a fourth-round draft pick in 2011;
 July 10, 2009 — Signed as a free agent by the Montreal Canadiens;
 November 11, 2014 — Traded to the Dallas Stars for Sergei Gonchar.

References

External links 

1982 births
Anaheim Ducks players
Calgary Flames draft picks
Canadian ice hockey forwards
Canadian people of Norwegian descent
Chicago Blackhawks players
Dallas Stars players
Ice hockey people from Saskatchewan
Kelowna Rockets players
Living people
Mighty Ducks of Anaheim players
Montreal Canadiens players
Norfolk Admirals players
People from Swift Current
San Jose Sharks players
Stanley Cup champions